City Harbor was a contemporary Christian music duo from Nashville, Tennessee. They released their first album, City Harbor, on February 4, 2014 through Sparrow Records. The album and its two lead singles have achieved positive critical reception, commercial and radio airplay success.

Background

In 2011, City Harbor was formed in Nashville, Tennessee and it consisted of duo Molly Reed and Josh Varnadore. However, Varnadore left the duo in late 2012 for a ministry opportunity in Texas. So Robby Earle was added as the male part of the duo.

In 2012, the duo were signed to Sparrow Records, a major Christian music label in the United States.

City Harbor
On February 4, 2014, they released City Harbor which had two singles: "Somebody Tell Them" that charted at a peak of No. 32 on the Billboard Christian Songs chart and "Come However You Are" that peaked at No. 31 on the same chart. They released version of "It's the Most Wonderful Time of the Year", which charted at No. 47 on the Christian Songs chart.

Members
Former
 Josh Varnadore — vocals, guitar
Steven Taylor — vocals, drums, guitar
 Molly Reed — vocals, guitar
 Robby Earle -- vocals, guitar, piano

Discography

Studio albums

Singles

References

Musical groups established in 2011
Sparrow Records artists
2011 establishments in Tennessee